Poeten og Lillemor og Lotte is a 1960 Danish comedy film directed by Erik Balling and starring Henning Moritzen.

Cast
 Henning Moritzen as The poet
 Helle Virkner as Lillemor
 Ove Sprogøe as Anton
 Lis Løwert as Vera
 Dirch Passer as The baker
 Judy Gringer as Bagerjomfru Lise
 Bodil Udsen as The midwife
 Karl Stegger as Slagteren
 Arne Weel as Redaktøren
 Bjørn WattasBoolsen as Fotografen
 Preben Kaas as Journalisten
 Holger Hansen as Ministeren
 Ove Rud as Vred ung mand

References

External links
 

1960 films
1960s Danish-language films
1960 comedy films
Films directed by Erik Balling
Films with screenplays by Erik Balling
Films based on Danish comics
Live-action films based on comics
Danish comedy films